The Pantepui thrush (Turdus murinus) is a bird in the genus Turdus native to the tepuis of northern South America. It was previously considered conspecific with the black-billed thrush, but genetic data indicates that the two are not closely related.

Distribution and habitat
The species occurs in the foothills of southern Guyana and Venezuela. It inhabits a variety of habitats including clearings, savannas with gallery woodland, cerrado, humid forest borders, coffee plantations, and various other habitats under anthropogenic influence.

References

Birds described in 1885
Birds of the Guianas
Birds of Venezuela
Turdus
Taxa named by Osbert Salvin